İskender kebap is a Turkish dish that consists of sliced döner kebab meat topped with hot tomato sauce over pieces of pita bread (sometimes croutons) and generously slathered with melted special sheep's milk butter and yogurt. It can be prepared from thinly and carefully cut grilled lamb or chicken. Tomato sauce and melted butter are generally poured over the dish live at the table, for the customer's amusement.

It is one of the most popular dishes of Turkey. It takes its name from its inventor, İskender Efendi, who lived in Bursa in the late 19th century Ottoman Empire.

"Kebapçı İskender" is trademarked by the İskenderoğlu family, who still run the restaurant in Bursa. This dish is available in many restaurants throughout the country mostly under the name "İskender kebap", "Bursa kebabı", or at times with an alternative one made up by the serving restaurant such as "Uludağ kebabı".

See also

 List of kebabs
 Turkish cuisine

References

External links
Original İskender Restaurant 
Home Style Iskender Recipe

Culture in Bursa
Kebabs
Skewered kebabs
Middle Eastern grilled meats
Turkish cuisine
Turkish words and phrases